Mount Sis is a mountain in Görele, Giresun Province, Turkey, very near the border with Trabzon Province. Its elevation is 2182 m (7159 ft) and it is part of the Pontic Mountains.

Mount Sis Festival attracts hundreds of people from Giresun and Trabzon to visit Mount Sis. During the festival, traditional costumes are worn by visitors. The first Mount Sis Festival is thought to be held in 1830s. Mount Sis has also a plateau which is called "Sis Dağı Yaylası" in Turkey.

References 

Mountains of Turkey
Landforms of Giresun Province